Mart Dokuzu Herb Festival is a festival held every year in Özbek neighborhood of Urla district of İzmir. During the festival, the participants go up to the hills in Özbek and collect herbs that are beneficial for health. In addition, a bazaar is set up in the square of the neighborhood and the people living there sell what they produce in this bazaar. Also, cooking workshops are held in the neighborhood.

References 

Festivals in İzmir